San Nicolas (Ilocano: Ili ti San Nicolas; Filipino: Bayan ng San Nicolas), officially the Municipality of San Nicolas,  is a 1st class municipality in the province of Ilocos Norte, Philippines. According to the 2020 census, it has a population of 38,895 people.

Etymology 
The present name of San Nicolas was given in the year 1733, after Saint Nicholas of Tolentino, who was believed to have protected the people against floods, earthquakes, fires, typhoons and other calamities. It is significant that in Ilocos Norte, only San Nicolas was named after a saint.

History 
Like any other town in the ancient province of Ilocos, San Nicolas was established by Augustinian missionaries. Vigan, the first Spanish mission center in this region, was founded in 1572. In the year 1575, when the Spaniards first explored the Laoag (Padsan) River, they met hostile resistance from the natives of San Nicolas and Laoag.  In another expedition dispatched from Vigan in 1584 San Nicolas was established and Laoag followed a year later.

San Nicolas Catholic Church built in 1701 is one of the oldest buildings in this province.  Its original structure is one of the must see places of the town.  The Church and the attached Santa Rosa Academy Building, the well preserved Municipal Hall and the old Town Plaza sprawled between them constitute the heart of the town center.  These buildings and structures are originally built and continue to be festooned with earthen bricks, which is among the products of the surviving locals.

Geography

Barangays
The Municipality of San Nicolas is politically divided into 24 barangays. These barangays are headed by elected officials: Barangay Captain, Barangay Council, whose members are called Barangay Councilors. All are elected every three years.

Climate

San Nicolas has a tropical savanna climate with warm to hot temperatures year round. Temperatures dips sightly during the winter months between December to February.

Demographics

Religion 
Christianity is the predominant religion in the Philippines and is likewise the same in San Nicolas. Among the Christian denominations, the Catholic and Philippine Independent Churches make up the majority. Other Christian denominations represented in the town include Baptists, Pentecostals, Mormons, Charismatics and Jehovah's Witnesses, Church of God World Missions Phil. Inc. Below are the religious buildings situated in San Nicolas:

Calvary Baptist Church (Barangay 14)
Everlasting Baptist Church (Barangay 15)
Solid Rock Baptist Church (Barangay 20)
Free Gospel Church (Barangay 2)
Victory Church (Barangay 3)
Kingdom Hall of Jehovah's Witnesses (Barangay 2)

Saint Nicholas de Tolentino Parish Church (Barangay 3)
Iglesia Filipina Independiente (Barangay 3)
Church of Jesus Latter-Day Saints (Barangay 2)
Church of Jesus Latter-Day Saints (Barangay 21)
Iglesia ni Cristo (Barangay 1)
Jesus is Lord (Barangay 12)
 Church of God World Missions of the Philippine Inc. (Barangay16 & 17)

Economy 

Pottery-making is the main trademark of San Nicolas. It was introduced by the Spaniards mainly in Barangay 8, and they called it Alfareria, meaning "Art of Pottery". Other traditional crafts include the making of Tagapulot, Lapida, Chicharon and Longganisa. The town also has large ricefields.

San Nicolas also has a number of car stores and shops. Robinsons Ilocos, the largest mall in the province is located in the town center.

Government 
San Nicolas, belonging to the second congressional district of the province of Ilocos Norte, is governed by a mayor designated as its local chief executive and by a municipal council as its legislative body in accordance with the Local Government Code. The mayor, vice mayor, and the councilors are elected directly by the people through an election which is being held every three years.

Elected officials

Municipal seal 

 Shield, derived from the Provincial Seal of Ilocos Norte
 Gear, symbolizes the systematic livelihood of the people of San Nicolas, Ilocos Norte
 Tong and Hammer, represents the blacksmithing and labor
 Jar, signifies the pottery industry which dates back to the Spanish time
 Hide, denotes tannoing and leather craft
 Water, represents the irrigation system that produces two croppings a year
 Carabao Head, the common work-animal; friend of the farmer; symbolizes agriculture

Tourism
San Nicolas is a place of historic buildings. Examples are San Nicolas de Tolentino Parish Church and San Nicolas Municipal Hall.
 Damili Festival- A festival annually celebrated at the last week of December to showcase the tradition of San Nicolenos. And the highlights of the festival is the Damili Street Dance and Showdown Competition usually held every December 28.
 Valdez Center-The biggest project of Venvi Group of Companies. Robinsons Mall, 365 Plaza, Freddo, Balai Condominium, and McDonald's San Nicolas, Venvi IT Park (Accenture, a BPO Company), VYV San Nicolas (EGS, a BPO Company) are situated here. More infrastructure is seen to rise in this place. This area is the business district of San Nicolas and is also an emerging business center in Ilocos Norte.
 Robinsons Ilocos - the first full-service and currently the largest mall in the province. It was opened on December 3, 2009. It contributes to the town's revenues and to the province as well. The mall has undergone expansion to cater the growing market of the province.
 Northwestern University Ecotourism Park and Botanical Gardens-A member of the Botanic Garden Conservation International (BGCI), which caters to the conservation of important indigenous plant species of the province which are now on the verge of extinction.
 St. Nicholas de Tolentino Parish Church
 San Nicolas Town Plaza
 Buabo-Buabo
Valdes Residencia
Valdez-Lardizabal House - used in World War II as a Headquarters of the Japanese Army and also used in the American Regime.
San Nicolas Municipal Hall
Tey Balay ti Tao - used as the main storage house of the people that lived there and as evacuation area for the people

Healthcare

 The Black Nazarene Hospital, Inc - located in Barangay 2
 Municipal Health Center - located in Barangay 3
 Gertes Hospital - located in Barangay 15
 Mamaclay Clinic - located in Barangay 7

Sports 

Basketball is widely played in the town. Every year, there is a competition in basketball sponsored by the local government. As the countries' National Game, Sepak Takraw is also played. Volleyball, baseball, softball and badminton are also played mainly in schools.

Events 

Damili Festival
San Nicolas, the home of the famous "damili," a product of a rare soil given by God.This is a lively song 'Agdamdamili' at the same time a graceful occupational dance that was adopted into the town fiesta which falls in December. This is the highlight of the festivities for which the 24 barangays of the town prepared a month before. The colorful costumes, the gracefulness of the dancers, and the different intricacies of making damili give life to the contest.

 In the municipality of San Nicolas, there is a contest where students are encouraged to join in that could measure their knowledge of the pertinent facts of the said municipality. According to the author of the book "History of San Nicolas", Fiscal Manuel Flores Aurelio, a noted historian, digested and elucidated all the pertinent facts about San Nicolas from where it started as a pueblo, now a second-class municipality.

Education

High Schools

San Nicolas National High School (SNNHS) - is the most popular high school destination for teens living in the urban-part of the town. It is also the most populated school in San Nicolas. As of S.Y. 2015-2016 the school's attendance is than 1,500 of students. The school offers various curriculum. (Special Science Curriculum/Class, SPA, Open High, SPED, and Regular)
Bingao National High School - formerly SNNHS Bingao Campus. But last June 9, 2015,the school was announced to be a separate school from SNNHS.
Santa Rosa Academy - the least populated school in San Nicolas and town's only private and Catholic School. Named after St. Rose of Lima, the patron saint of one of its founders. It is one of the oldest schools in the Diocese of Laoag. It was established in 1936 by the late Msgr. Fidel Albano, together with the late Miss Rosa Valdes, Mrs. Teresa Llopis Zabala and Miss Castora Bonoan.

Elementary Schools

San Nicolas Elementary School - also known as Central School, located at Barangay3.
Eladio V. Barangan Memorial Elementary School - Located at Barangay14
Cayetano Bumanglag Memorial Elementary School - Formerly Payas Elementary School, located at Barangay16
Catuguing Elementary School - Located at Barangay22
Asuncion Elementary School - Located at Barangay17
Bugnay Wine Elementary School - Located at Barangay21
Bingao Elementary School - Located at Barangay18
Filipinas East Elementary School - Formerly Filipinas Elementary School-Main Campus and located at Barangay7 (East)
Filipinas West Elementary School - Formerly Filipinas Elementary School-Annex Campus and located at Barangay7 (West)
Pasion Barangan Memorial Elementary School - Located at Barangay24
Barabar Elementary School - Located at Barangay23

Sister cities 
 Agoo, La Union
 Licab, Nueva Ecija

References

External links

[ Philippine Standard Geographic Code]
Philippine Census Information
Local Governance Performance Management System

Municipalities of Ilocos Norte